Donovan Jomo Pagon (born 13 September 1982) is a West Indian cricketer. He attended Wolmer's Schools.

He has the record for the highest ever individual score in the history of U19 Cricket World Cup (176)

Pagon made his Test debut in March 2005 after several high-profile players including Brian Lara and Chris Gayle were caught in a row over sponsorship. Pagon achieved a 35 on his debut, and currently averages around 30. Thereafter he never played international cricket.

References 

1982 births
Living people
Jamaican cricketers
West Indies Test cricketers
Jamaica cricketers
Sportspeople from Kingston, Jamaica
West Indies B cricketers